100% is the second extended play by Mexican-American singer and songwriter Monogem, which was released on May 19, 2017. The EP was supported by four singles: "Gone", "Take It Slow", "Wild", and "100%".

Release and promotion

Singles 
At the end of 2015, Monogem released a single titled "Gone". On April 22, 2016, she released another single, "Take It Slow", which features a "slinking beat, ethereal synths, and the singer's smokey alto".

A year later on January 20, 2016, the single "Wild" was released. The single also included a music video featuring Matthew RC Taylor and Coco Arquette, the daughter of Courteney Cox. The music video includes "a dreamy and colorful story about... two young teenagers getting wild in their own unique way". The video was released on March 29, 2017.

"100%" was released as the last single from the EP.

Remix 
Monogem released a remixed version of her second extended play that features producers Zach Nicita, Paperwhite, Jamie Prado and ELIS.

Track listing

Release history

References 

2017 EPs
Self-released EPs
Pop music EPs
EPs by American artists
Monogem albums